Nightclubbing may refer to:

 Nightclubbing (Grace Jones album), 1981
 Nightclubbing (Blank & Jones album), 2001
 "Nightclubbing" (song), a 1977 song by Iggy Pop, from the album The Idiot
 Nightclubbing, going out to a nightclub